Sendenhorst is a town in the district of Warendorf, in North Rhine-Westphalia, Germany.

Geography 
Sendenhorst consists of Sendenhorst and Albersloh. Before the municipal reform of 1975, Sendenhorst was located in the former Beckum District and Albersloh in the former district of Münster (Landkreis). The river Werse flows through Albersloh.

References